Niall Lynch may refer to:

Niall Lynch (Gaelic football), manager of Mullahoran GFC
Niall Lynch-Robinson of the Lynch-Robinson Baronets

See also
Neil Lynch (disambiguation)